Discoverer Clear Leader  is a double hulled dynamically positioned drillship, capable of operating in moderate environments and water depths up to 12,000 feet (3,657m) using an , 15,000 psi blowout preventer (BOP), and a  outside diameter (OD) marine riser. The Marshall Islands-flagged vessel is owned by Transocean, and is operating in the Gulf of Mexico of the United States.

Sister ships 
Discoverer Clear Leader design is a "Transocean Offshore enhanced Enterprise-class" and has four other sister ships: Discoverer Americas, Discoverer Inspiration, Discoverer Luanda, and Discoverer India.

References

External links
 Transocean official website
 Discoverer Clear Leader — V7MO2 — position and weather at Sailwx
 Discoverer Clear Leader current position at VesselTracker

Drillships
Transocean
2009 ships
Ships built by Daewoo Shipbuilding & Marine Engineering